Ernest Robert Clark (born August 11, 1937) is a former professional American football player who played linebacker for six seasons for the Detroit Lions and two for the St. Louis Cardinals.

1937 births
Living people
People from Arcadia, Florida
Players of American football from Florida
American football linebackers
Michigan State Spartans football players
Detroit Lions players
St. Louis Cardinals (football) players